Rolando Bragaglia is an Italian former competitive figure skater. In the 1970s, he won the national title and represented Italy at five ISU Championships. He finished in the top fifteen at the 1974 European Championships in Zagreb.

Bragaglia has worked as a technical specialist at skating competitions in Italy.

Competitive highlights

References 

Italian male single skaters
Living people
Year of birth missing (living people)